Mount Sylvania is an extinct volcano, part of the Boring Lava Field, on the outskirts of Portland, Oregon. Parts of the mountain are within the cities of Portland, Lake Oswego, and Tigard.

The Sylvania campus of Portland Community College is located on the mountain's western slopes.

References

External links 
 

Volcanoes of Oregon
Mountains of Oregon
Subduction volcanoes
Cascade Volcanoes
Volcanoes of Multnomah County, Oregon
Volcanoes of Clackamas County, Oregon
Lake Oswego, Oregon
Shield volcanoes of the United States
Mountains of Clackamas County, Oregon
Landforms of Multnomah County, Oregon